Tanganyika (subtitled Modern Afro-American Jazz) is an album by multi-instrumentalist and composer Buddy Collette recorded at sessions in late 1956 and released on Johnny Otis' short-lived Dig label.

Reception

Allmusic awarded the album 3  stars with the review by Scott Yanow stating "The music is mostly group originals (five by Collette) and is an excellent example of cool jazz".

Track listing
All compositions by Buddy Collette except where noted.
 "Green Dream" - 4:28
 "It's You" - 2:27
 "A Walk on the Veldt" - 3:23 	
 "How Long Has This Been Going On?" (George Gershwin, Ira Gershwin) - 3:14
 "The Blindfold Test" (John Anderson) - 6:50
 "Jungle Pogo Stick" - 2:44
 "Tanganyika" - 4:57
 "Wagnervous" (Chico Hamilton, Gerald Wiggins) - 4:42
 "And So Is Love" (Anderson) - 2:43
 "Coming Back for More" (Johnny Otis) - 6:28

Personnel
Buddy Collette - tenor saxophone, alto saxophone, flute, clarinet
John Anderson - trumpet
Gerald Wiggins - piano
Jimmy Hall - guitar
Curtis Counce - bass
Chico Hamilton - drums

References

Buddy Collette albums
1956 albums